"Re:make/No Scared" is the 6th single by Japanese rock band ONE OK ROCK. It was released on July 20, 2011 under A-Sketch label. It peaked at #10 on Billboard Japan Hot 100. The single also charted at 6th place on the Oricon charts and stayed for 10 weeks.

"Re:make" was used in Recochoku Co, Ltd. commercial, while "NO SCARED" was used in the Black Rock Shooter: The Game PSP video game.

Music video 
The music video for "Re:make" was first released on September 21, 2011 by the music label A-Sketch YouTube channel, then uploaded by the band's newly created channel in April 2012. It was directed by Suzuki Daishin, showing the band performing the track energetically in front of LED display.

On August 2, 2011, the music label channel released the music video of "No Scared", and the band uploaded it on the same day as "Re:make" in 2012. Directed by Masakazu Fukatsu, it features the band playing in studio. A recording staff is headbanging while enjoying the recording process until someone comes and taps him on the shoulder then starts headbanging too. A pizza delivery guy comes and accidentally touches the staff's hand so he joins the headbanging. He leaves the studio and nudges the people around him so that a similar incident is repeated until the whole city is headbanging together, until the song ends.

Track listing 
All songs were written by Taka.

Personnel
One Ok Rock
 Takahiro "Taka" Moriuchi — lead vocals
 Toru Yamashita — lead guitar, rhythm guitar
 Ryota Kohama — bass guitar
 Tomoya Kanki — drums, percussion

Production
 Koichi Korenaga — arranger  
 Akkin — arranger

Charts

Single

Songs

References 

2011 songs
2011 singles
One Ok Rock songs
Songs written by Takahiro Moriuchi
A-Sketch singles